Planet Hollywood Las Vegas (formerly the Aladdin) is a casino hotel on the Las Vegas Strip in Paradise, Nevada. It is owned and operated by Caesars Entertainment. The property was previously the site of an earlier resort known as the Aladdin, which operated from 1962 to 1997. It was demolished in 1998, to make room for a new resort that would also be named Aladdin. The new Aladdin resort opened in August 2000, but suffered financial difficulties and was eventually purchased in 2003 by a partnership of Planet Hollywood and Starwood, which renamed it as Planet Hollywood in 2007.

Hilton Grand Vacations operates the timeshare portion of the property, known as Elara.

History

Original resort (1962–1997)

The property was initially the site of the Tallyho hotel, opened by Edwin S. Lowe in 1962. It was sold later that year and renamed as King's Crown Tallyho. In 1966, Milton Prell purchased the hotel and reopened it as the Aladdin. In 1994, the Aladdin was purchased by Las Vegas real estate developer Jack Sommer and the Sommer Family Trust. The Aladdin closed on November 25, 1997.

New Aladdin (2000–2007)
In February 1998, Aladdin Gaming announced that it had financed plans for a new Aladdin resort, expected to cost $826 million, while Planet Hollywood would develop a music-themed resort, tentatively known as Aladdin Music Project, which would be built behind the Aladdin. The cost of the new Aladdin complex would total $1.3 billion, although the music project was canceled at the end of the year after Aladdin Gaming ended its partnership with Planet Hollywood, because of concerns that Planet Hollywood could not produce a $41 million commitment to the project.

On April 27, 1998, the original Aladdin hotel tower was imploded to make way for construction of the new Aladdin resort. The Aladdin Theatre was retained and incorporated into the new resort.

Sommer took on London Clubs International as a partner in developing the new casino resort. LCI initially paid $50 million for a 25% interest, but took on additional equity after Sommer was unable to fund his share of cost overruns on the construction.

The new Aladdin was scheduled to open on August 17, 2000, at 6:00 p.m., with fireworks at 10:00 p.m. The opening was delayed while the Clark County building inspector completed its fire safety testing. Another delay was caused by last-minute repairs to the casino surveillance system. This left thousands of Aladdin visitors leaving in disappointment, as well as opening night hotel guests wondering where they'd spend the night. Many high-rollers waited out on the sidewalks in front of the Aladdin for hours. Most were unable to even get to their luggage, since the hotel had been locked down for testing. Aladdin employees tried to arrange alternate accommodations for the guests with Paris and Bellagio.

Meanwhile, the Desert Passage mall was opened with I Dream of Jeannie star Barbara Eden opening the doors to let the large crowd in.

The Aladdin finally opened the next day at 7:45 a.m. 100 members of Culinary Workers Union Local 226, as well as more than 1,000 other workers were marching on Las Vegas Boulevard to protest the Aladdin opening without a union contract. Eden's speech as well as the other festivities were drowned out by the bullhorns and the rest of the protest.

According to Josh Axelrad in his 2010 book, Repeat until Rich, he and other professional gamblers, primarily card counters, took advantage of the Aladdin's inexperienced staff its opening weekend and fleeced the casino for an undetermined but large amount of money. The casino later introduced severe limits on mid-shoe bets in response.

The Aladdin was in financial trouble from the time it opened, and entered Chapter 11 bankruptcy protection in September 2001. In February 2002, Aladdin Gaming was searching for potential buyers. The resort was sold in bankruptcy on June 20, 2003, to a partnership of Planet Hollywood and Starwood.

Planet Hollywood (2007–present)

Renovations were carried out in stages, allowing the resort to remain open throughout. Planet Hollywood Las Vegas includes an expanded casino, new restaurants, new nightclub and retail space. A redesign of the facade and pedestrian plaza was intended to correct defects that made accessing the property from the sidewalks on The Strip difficult.

The retail space formerly known as "The Desert Passage" was converted into the Hollywood-themed "Miracle Mile Shops".

After the casino was renovated, it was renamed as "Planet Hollywood Las Vegas" on April 17, 2007. The official grand opening was the weekend of November 16, 2007. The Planet Hollywood restaurant, however, remains at The Forum Shops at Caesars.

The casino defaulted on its mortgage and had failed to make scheduled payments in September 2009. Harrah's Entertainment began its process of taking over the property in December 2009 by purchasing some of the resort's debt.

On January 16, 2010, Starwood dropped its affiliation so Harrah's could take over hotel operations. On February 18, 2010, the Nevada Gaming Commission gave Harrah's the approval to take over the property. Harrah's officially acquired the property on February 19, 2010. Harrah's Total Rewards program was phased into Planet Hollywood which was completed in April 2010.

Marilyn Winn stepped in as President of the resort; she was President of Paris Las Vegas and Bally's Las Vegas, both Harrah's hotels. Robert Earl, former president and founder of the Planet Hollywood brand, stayed on to advise Harrah's on marketing strategies for Planet Hollywood Hotel and the other nine Harrah's properties in the Las Vegas area. Winn left Caesars Entertainment (formerly Harrah's Entertainment) later that year.

Caesars does not own Prive Nightclub, nor some restaurants in the hotel. It does not own the newly branded Elara (formerly PH Tower by Westgate that opened in December 2009), as Hilton Grand Vacations, part of Hilton Worldwide now operates that tower's hotel operations. Through a licensing agreement, Caesars now has the right to use the Planet Hollywood trademark at other properties worldwide.

Features

Casino

Planet Hollywood's architecture can best be described as having a 'Hollywood hip' theme. It eschews the popular Art-Deco glamour of similarly imaged venues for a sleeker look that features plenty of glass, neon and reflective surfaces.

The resort features a three-acre casino floor full of traditional gambling machines like slots, table games and The Playing Field Race and Sports Book. This features 33 plasma screens, two jumbo screens and a section for VIP. Planet Hollywood is the first Las Vegas resort to offer table games dealt by young ladies in "chic lingerie". The Pleasure Pit is a section of the table games where this happens with go-go dancers entertaining the gamblers at the side.

Skill-based gaming machines from Gamblit Gaming were introduced in March 2017, the first of their kind in Las Vegas. Gamblit Poker and Cannonbeard's Treasure are currently available, with more titles to come in the future.

"The Mezzanine"

The Mezzanine can be accessed by taking an escalator in the casino or the elevator. Here, guests can relax on comfy chairs overlooking the casino. The space was designed to be quieter than the main areas of the casino, where guests come to lounge and smoke. The area is rather spaced out with room to walk and includes a place for shooting basketball hoops. It includes a "Living Room" with sofas to be accessed by the guests.

The Planet Hollywood showroom is located on the Mezzanine. It features several different live shows; as of 2010, the most popular and longest-running is titled Peepshow which previously starred headliners such as Holly Madison and Coco Austin in the leading role. A live version of the television series America's Got Talent hosted by Jerry Springer (who flew to Vegas weekly from his self-titled show's taping in Stamford, Connecticut) and Tony n' Tina's Wedding played on the Mezzanine in 2009.

"The Spa by Mandara" is located on this floor. Two fine dining restaurants, KOI and Strip House, are present here, across from the wedding chapel.

Swimming pool

The swimming pool in this resort can be accessed through the sixth floor. The area overlooks the Strip with a view of the north and south. It features two pools and two hot spa one of each in both the South and North Strip. The one in the North Strip section features VIP cabanas for renting. In between is a bar/grill/snack-bar with a patch of grass lined with pool chairs for guests to sit and eat.

Zappos Theater

Zappos Theater is an auditorium located inside the Miracle Mile Shops. In 2011, it was voted as one of the "Best Concert Halls & Theaters In Las Vegas". It is the largest theater of its kind in the United States and the largest theater on The Strip.

Britney: Piece of Me

Beginning in December 2013, the venue was home to Britney Spears's residency show, Britney: Piece Of Me. Spears performed 50 shows per year in 2014 and 2015. She reportedly earned around $475,000 a show. The first show began on December 27, 2013, and was well received by fans and critics. In 2015, the residency was extended for two more years and the residency show concluded on December 31, 2017. The last show of the residency on December 31, 2017, broke the record for the highest-grossing single concert in a theater residency ever in Las Vegas. It grossed nearly $1.2 million for 4,600 fans and $255 average ticket price. Her decision to do this inspired her contemporaries like Jennifer Lopez and newer artists like Lady Gaga to do similar residencies. She has also brought a younger cohort to the Strip.

Accommodations
The Planet Hollywood Resort features rooms that meet its Hollywood theme. Rooms feature actual props and memorabilia from the film. The rooms range from standard to luxurious "Panorama" suites with a view of the whole Las Vegas Strip. In early 2017, the casino completed a $100 million project to remodel all 2,500 rooms.

Elara

In December 2009, PH Towers by Westgate opened at Planet Hollywood. The 52-story building, owned by Westgate Resorts and operated by Planet Hollywood, featured 1,200 suites to be used as timeshares and hotel rooms, including 40 luxury penthouse units.

In November 2011, Resort Finance America, a subsidiary of Centerbridge Partners, acquired a controlling interest in the tower, took over operations, and began rebranding it as a Hilton Grand Vacations resort. In March 2012, the property was renamed Elara, a Hilton Grand Vacations Club.

Film history
The Aladdin/Planet Hollywood has been featured in various television shows and films.

Seasons One and Two of the A&E Network show Criss Angel Mindfreak were filmed at the resort.

The TLC show Trading Spaces took place at the Aladdin in a 2004 episode.

The Theatre for the Performing Arts was the site for the 2006 to 2012 Miss America pageants, the Miss USA pageants from 2008 to 2013, and hosted Miss Universe 1991, Miss Universe 1996, Miss Universe 2012 and the Miss Universe 2015.

The Resident Evil: Extinction (2007) world premiere took place at Planet Hollywood on September 25, 2007.

The Rambo (2008) world premiere took place at Planet Hollywood on January 24, 2008.

Scenes from the 2008 movie 21 were shot in Planet Hollywood.

The Planet Hollywood hotel is prominently featured in the movie What Happens in Vegas as the hotel where the Fullers stay and get married.

The movie Transporter 3 had its world premiere at PH on November 21, 2008. Jason Statham was present for the premiere.

The movie Race to Witch Mountain was partly shot here for the space convention

The movie The Expendables premiered at PH in August 2010. This was announced by a helicopter that was displayed on the casino floor.

Seasons One and Two of Holly's World were shot at the Planet Hollywood. Holly Madison starred in Peepshow on property until 2012.

A flashmob set to Midi Mafia's "PHamous" was performed by several YouTubers including Shay Carl and KassemG in November 2009.

Scenes from Get Him to the Greek were filmed and take place at PH.

Scenes from Knocked Up were filmed at PH.

The nearly completed structure can be seen in the 2009 film, The Hangover.

The documentary The Queen of Versailles discusses former owner David A. Siegel's struggle and hardship to secure funding for PH Towers.

An episode of the Web series Jake and Amir was shot in the Hollywood Hip Queen Room of the hotel.

The Planet Hollywood hotel is briefly seen in the 2013 film, The Hangover Part III

See also

 List of casinos in Nevada
 List of tallest buildings in Las Vegas

References

External links
 
 Planet Hollywood (Aladdin) News – Vegas Today and Tomorrow
 Las Vegas Travelog. Including tens of photos.
 

Casino hotels
Casinos completed in 2000
Hotels established in 2000
Casinos in the Las Vegas Valley
Hotel buildings completed in 2000
Companies that filed for Chapter 11 bankruptcy in 2001
Las Vegas Strip
Resorts in the Las Vegas Valley
Skyscraper hotels in Paradise, Nevada
2000 establishments in Nevada
Caesars Entertainment